Gregory Gatson (born March 24, 1989) is an American football cornerback in the National Football League. He is a free agent. He has played for the San Diego Chargers. He played college football for the Arkansas Razorbacks.

References

1989 births
Living people
American football cornerbacks
Arkansas Razorbacks football players
Players of American football from Dallas
San Diego Chargers players